Konak Mosque, also called Yalı Mosque, is a mosque in İzmir, Turkey. It is located on Konak Square in the heart of the city next to the Governor's Mansion and the İzmir Clock Tower. Despite its relatively small size, it is considered one of the landmarks of the city for its distinctive octagonal shape and elaborate tilework.

The Mosque was constructed in 1755 under the patronage of Ayşe Hanım, the wife of Katipzade Mehmet Paşa who governed İzmir at the time. The outer tiles were brought from Kütahya. It has a single dome and minaret and unusually for a mosque, only one entrance. The interior is lit by a chandelier by Ümran Baradan.

References

External links

Religious buildings and structures completed in 1755
Architecture in Turkey
Ottoman mosques in İzmir
Konak District
18th-century mosques
Mosque buildings with domes